Charlie Javice (born ) is the founder and former CEO of Frank, a student financial aid application assistance company, which she sold to JPMorgan Chase for $175 million in September 2021.

Education 
Javice attended the French-American School of New York and graduated from the Wharton School of the University of Pennsylvania in 2013, where she studied finance.

Career 
She founded Frank in 2016. She stated in a 2018 interview that Frank secured an average of $28,000 for its users. She was appointed managing director at JPMorgan, overseeing student-focused products at Chase, after the 2021 acquisition of Frank. She was suspended in September 2022 following a lawsuit by her employer, and was terminated for cause in November 2022.

Lawsuit 
A 2022 lawsuit filed by JPMorgan claims that Frank's claims were largely a fabrication, and alleges that Javice paid a data science professor $18,000 for a list of more than 4 million fake student names to convince JPMorgan to purchase the startup. Javice countersued JPMorgan claiming that she was being scapegoated for their own faulty due diligence.

Recognition
 2019: Named in Forbes 30 Under 30 - Finance
 2019: Named in Crain's New York Business 40 Under 40

References 

Year of birth uncertain
Living people
Wharton School of the University of Pennsylvania alumni